Ben Jacobs (born 17 May 1982) is a former Australian rugby union footballer who last played for Wasps RFC in the Aviva Premiership. Jacobs was a member of the inaugural ARC winning Central Coast Rays side in 2007.

References

External links
Waratahs profile

Rugby union players from Sydney
Rugby union centres
1982 births
Living people
Saracens F.C. players
Wasps RFC players
Australian expatriate rugby union players
New South Wales Waratahs players
Western Force players
Expatriate rugby union players in England
Expatriate rugby union players in Japan
Australian expatriate sportspeople in England
Australian expatriate sportspeople in Japan
Kyuden Voltex players